Tang-e Boraq (also Romanized as Tang-e Borāq) is a village in Dezhkord Rural District, Sedeh District, Eqlid County, Fars Province, Iran. At the 2006 census, its population was 425, in 100 families.

References 

Populated places in Eqlid County